Eyes Set Against the Sun is the third studio album by Mira Calix. It was released by Warp Records in 2007.

Critical reception
Alex Macpherson of The Guardian gave the album 3 stars out of 5, saying, "Although Calix's tendency to favour snap and crackle over pop means she sometimes wanders into musical dead ends, that is outweighed by the atmosphere of bucolic peace she evokes."

Track listing

References

External links
 

2007 albums
Mira Calix albums
Warp (record label) albums